N.P. Choudhary was an Indian politician and member of the Indian National Congress party. He represented Patan (Madhya Pradesh Vidhan Sabha constituency). He also served as a Rajya Sabha member continuously from 1968 to 1980 represented Madhya Pradesh State. Served as a Mayor in Jabalpur Nagar Nigam.

References 

Madhya Pradesh politicians
Indian National Congress politicians from Madhya Pradesh
Indian National Congress politicians
Year of birth missing (living people)
Living people